Tsurphu Monastery ( or Tölung Tsurphu ("Tsurphu of Tölong") is a gompa which serves as the traditional seat of the Karmapa, the head of the Karma Kagyu lineage of Tibetan Buddhism. It is located in Gurum in Doilungdêqên District, Tibet Autonomous Region, China,  from Lhasa.

It was built in the middle of the valley facing south with high mountains surrounding the complex.

The gompa, the traditional seat of the Karmapa lamas, is about  up the Dowo Lung Valley on the north side of the river. The original walls of the main building were up to 4 meters thick and 300 meters on each side. The monks' residences were on the eastern side.

History

Tsurphu was founded by Düsum Khyenpa, 1st Karmapa Lama (1110-1193) in 1159, after he visited the site and laid the foundation for an establishment of a seat there by making offerings to the local protectors, the dharmapalas and territorial divinities. In 1189 he revisited the site and founded his main seat there. The monastery grew to hold 1000 monks.

The complex was totally destroyed in 1966 during the Cultural Revolution. Rangjung Rigpe Dorje, 16th Karmapa, began to rebuild it in 1980; he died in 1981.

Following the recognition of Ogyen Trinley Dorje (born 1985) as the 17th Karmapa by the Tai Situpa, the Dalai Lama and China's governmental offices, he was enthroned at Tsurphu and resided there until he escaped from Tibet to India in 2000.

Branch monastery 
A Yelpa Kagyu monastery, Jang Tana, in Nangchen, Kham, is considered a branch monastery of Tsurpu. It was founded by Yelpa Yeshe Tsek in 1068.

Variant names 
Variant names for the monastery include: Tsurphu, 楚布寺, mtshur mdo bo lung dgon, 祖普寺, Okmin Tsurpu, 'og min mtshur phu.

Pilgrims

Sources

 

Dowman, Keith. The Power-places of Central Tibet: The Pilgrim's Guide. 1988. Routledge & Kegan Paul. London. 
Martin, Michele. Music in the Sky: The Life, Art & Teachings of the 17th Karmapa, Ogyen Trinley Dorje. 2003. Snow Lion Publications. Reprint: New Age Books, New Delhi, 2004. .

References

External links
 Tsurphu Monastery Website
 The Tsurphu Appliques

Buddhist monasteries in Lhasa (prefecture-level city)
Buddhist temples in Tibet
Karma Kagyu monasteries and temples
1159 establishments in Asia
Religious organizations established in the 1150s
Doilungdêqên District